Naufahu is both a given name and surname. Notable people with the name include:

Naufahu Tahi (born 1981), American football player
Joe Naufahu (born 1978), New Zealand rugby union player
Nisifolo Naufahu (born 1977), Tongan rugby union player
Rene Naufahu (born 1970), New Zealand actor

Tongan-language surnames